Sandimuni is a 2020 Tamil language horror comedy film directed by Milka S. Selvakumar. The film stars  Natty and Manisha Yadav.

Plot 
After the wife Tamarai dies (Manisha Yadav), the husband Sandimuni (Natty) falls in love with another girl Radhika (Manisha Yadav). After seeing him loving another girl, the spirit of his dead wife could not bear this and starts attacking him.

Cast 
 Natty as Sandimuni, a civil engineer
 Manisha Yadav as  Tamarai / Radhika, a teacher
 Yogi Babu as Gorakh
 Aarthi
 Chaams
 Kadhal Sukumar 
Gowri Punithan
 Vasu Vikram
 Super Subbarayan
 Mayilsamy

Production 
This film marks the directorial debut of Selvakumar, who was a former associate of Raghava Lawrence. Much of the film takes place in a house in Meikarasapatti, near Palani. Yogi Babu was signed to play a second lead role.

Release 
Sandimuni was released on 7 February 2020. The Times of India gave the film one star out of five stars and wrote that "With hardly any innovative element in the narration, characterisation and screenplay, the movie is a colossal mess". Maalai Malar praised the songs, cinematography, and comedy scenes while criticizing the background score.

Soundtrack 
Songs for the film were composed by A. K. Rishalsai.
Kandangi En Manasukulla – M. M. Manasi, Jithinraj
Imayai Odhungum – Priya Himesh, Sathyaprakash
Perum Kovakaraa – Pavan, Rajalakshmi, Priya Prakash, Hemambigaa
Aalavattum Kudai – Hemambigaa
Dhaaga Jaala – Jesse Samuel, Sam. P. Keerthan

References

External links 

Indian comedy horror films
2020 directorial debut films
2020 films
2020s Tamil-language films
2020 comedy horror films
Films about spirit possession
2020 comedy films
2020 horror films
Indian comedy films
Indian ghost films
Indian horror films